CFHK may refer to:

 CFHK-FM, US radio station
Cards for Hospitalized Kids, US charity